KBS FM may refer to the Korean Broadcasting System's FM Radio stations:
 KBS Radio 2 (FM 106.1MHz, AM Relay 603kHz in Seoul and local stations.) - KBS's main Music FM station airing only KPop music
 KBS Classic FM (FM 93.1 in Seoul and local stations.) - KBS's Classical and oldies music station
 KBS Cool FM (FM 89.1 in Seoul FM 97.7 in Gyeonggi and FM 90.9 in Incheon.) - KBS's second popular music station that airs a variety of popular music from South Korea (KPop, Trot (music) and Hippop), Malaysia, Singapore, Hong Kong and US. Launched in 1966 as RSB (Radio Seoul Broadcasting), renamed as TBC-FM in the 1970s, adopted current name in 1980 after TBC-FM forced merged to KBS.